The American Cinema Editors Award for Best Edited Miniseries or Motion Picture for Television is one of the annual awards given by the American Cinema Editors. It has evolved throughout the history of the American Cinema Editors Awards, narrowing it's eligibility field numerous times.
 From 1972 to 1992, the award Best Edited Television Special was presented.
 In 1978, the category Best Edited Episode from a Television Mini-Series started to be presented alongside the television special category. The award was presented until 2003.
 In 1993, the television special award was renamed and split into Best Edited Motion Picture for Commercial Television and Best Edited Motion Picture for Commercial Television. From 1996 to 1998, the categories were renamed Best Edited Two-Hour Movie for Commercial Television and Best Edited Two-Hour Movie for Non-Commercial Television. In 1999, they went back to the names from 1993 until 2003.
 From 2004 to 2008, both the categories for miniseries and television movies were reorganized into Best Edited Miniseries or Motion Picture for Commercial Television and Best Edited Miniseries or Motion Picture for Non-Commercial Television
 From 2009 to 2020, the category was presented as Best Edited Miniseries or Motion Picture for Television.
 In 2021, the category was split into Best Edited Limited Series and Best Edited Motion Picture (Non-Theatrical).

Winners and nominees
 † – indicates the winner of a Primetime Emmy Award.
 ‡ – indicates a nomination for a Primetime Emmy Award.

1970s
Best Edited Television Special

Best Edited Episode from a Television Mini-Series

1980s
Best Edited Television Special

Best Edited Episode for a Television Mini-Series

1990s
Best Edited Television Special

Best Edited Motion Picture for Commercial Television

Best Edited Two-Hour Movie for Commercial Television

Best Edited Motion Picture for Commercial Television

Best Edited Motion Picture for Non-Commercial Television

Best Edited Two-Hour Movie for Non-Commercial Television

Best Edited Motion Picture for Non-Commercial Television

Best Edited Episode from a Television Mini-Series

2000s
Best Edited Motion Picture for Commercial Television

Best Edited Motion Picture for Non-Commercial Television

Best Edited Episode from a Television Mini-Series

Best Edited Miniseries or Motion Picture for Commercial Television

Best Edited Miniseries or Motion Picture for Non-Commercial Television

Best Edited Miniseries or Motion Picture for Television

2010s
Best Edited Miniseries or Motion Picture for Television

2020s

Best Edited Limited Series

Best Edited Motion Picture (Non-Theatrical)

References

External links
 

American Cinema Editors Awards